In communications systems, robbed-bit signaling (RBS) is a scheme to provide maintenance and line signaling services on many T1 digital carrier circuits using channel-associated signaling (CAS). The T1 carrier circuit is a type of dedicated circuit currently employed in North America and Japan.

Context
The T1 circuit is divided into 24 channels, each carrying 8,000 samples per second, each 8 bits long. The Super Frame (SF) consist of 12 frames of 24 channels. The DS1 designation consist of 24 frames called, Extended Super Frame (ESF). In either designation, these channels are multiplexed together and sample at 8000bit/s. In the superframe, ten frames are utilized entirely for voice/data and two are utilized partially for voice. Hence, each of the two partial frames yields bit/s = 56kbit/s for voice data per channel, compared to the bit/s = 64kbit/s per channel in the other frames.

Intuitively, 5 out of 6 frames have 8-bit resolution equal to 64kbit/s (8 bits × 8,000 samples per second = 64kbit/s) and 1 out of every 6 frames has a 7-bit resolution (7 bits × 8,000 samples per second = 56kbit/s). The total rate for a channel is therefore 62.666kbit/s. The distortion effect on voice and data signals is negligible when a modem is used for modulation. However, for a 64kbit/s digital signal the data will render errors when a data signal is transmitted. If such is the case the robbed-bit signaling should be turned off.

Bit robbing
The robbed-bit signal scheme is used in the super frame circuit (SF). It takes the least significant bit of each channel in every sixth frame and utilizes it to convey on or off hook, and busy signal status on telephone lines. The first bit of every six is called A bit, the second bit is called B bit.

RBS was developed at the time that AT&T was moving from analog trunks onto digital equipment. This permitted AT&T to run 24 digital phone lines on the same number of wires that 2 analog phone lines would have taken, saving money and improving call quality, without the high cost of frequency-division multiplexing.

As in other carrier systems, the physical properties of an actual trunk wire are missing. With analog trunks, to signal the equipment at the far end that a trunk was going to be used, equipment would "loop" the line by connecting the wires together at one end or ground start one of the wires (depending on the type of trunk), and do the opposite to return the trunk to idle. With a digital trunk, another method was needed to signal between ends.

To do this, signaling equipment "steals" the eighth bit of each channel on every sixth frame (see Super Frame and Extended Super Frame) and replaces it with signaling information. This means that the low-order bit on every sixth sample in every DS0 carried on the T1, in either direction, is replaced by signaling information. Simple PCM-encoded voice is not very sensitive to losing these data in a few of its lower-order bits, so it doesn't cause much degradation of voice quality; however, when carrying data, the difference is significant, reducing the available usable data rate by 12.5%. With full 64kbit/s, a voice channel has a signal-to-noise ratio of 37 decibels (dB). At 56kbit/s, a voice channel has a signal to noise ratio of 31dB. As only every sixth least-significant bit is robbed, the signal to noise ratio will be somewhere between 31 and 37dB. However, since individual T1 links are not in general synchronized to one another, a DS0 passing along several concatenated, unsynchronized, T1 spans may have its lower bit stolen in more than one frame, frequently making real-world performance closer to the lower-bound than the upper bound of signal-to-noise performance.

Robbed-bit signaling can have an effect on audio quality under certain circumstances. When a voice call is connected to a quiet termination, as can happen when on hold in a PBX that does not have music on hold or comfort noise enabled, and certain types of framing circuits are used, the noise due to robbed-bit signaling can be heard in the handset as a faint 1333Hz tone, this frequency being a result of low-bit corruption at a rate of  = 1333Hz.  This is normally not a very noticeable problem, but if the audio path contains in-line speech compression, such as G.729, the tone can be amplified and modulated by the compression algorithm to the point of annoyance to the user.

With Super Frame framing, the robbed bits are named A and B. With Extended Super Frame, the same stream is divided into four bits, named A, B, C, and D. The meanings of these bits depend on what type of signaling is provisioned on the channel. The most common types of signaling are loop start, ground start, and E&M.

Unlike T1 systems, most telephone systems in the world use E1 systems that transparently pass all 8 bits of every sample. Those systems use a separate out-of-band channel to carry the signaling information.

References

Telephony signals